The Williams Driver Academy is an initiative from Formula One team Williams to promote talent in different racing series by helping them with funds, with the hope of finding drivers who will race for the team in the future. Notable graduates of the scheme are Lance Stroll and Nicholas Latifi, who both made their F1 debuts with Williams.

Current drivers

Former drivers 

 Championship titles highlighted in bold.

See also 

 Williams Racing

References

Racing schools
Williams Grand Prix Engineering